Borzytuchom  (formerly ) is a village in Bytów County, Pomeranian Voivodeship, in northern Poland. It is the seat of the gmina (administrative district) called Gmina Borzytuchom.

Prior to 1945 it was in Germany.

The village has a population of 820.

References

Borzytuchom